Joseph Thomas Murphy is an American pediatrician currently at Children's Health, formerly Professor at  and the Editor-in-Chief of Pediatric Pulmonology.

References

Year of birth missing (living people)
Living people
American pediatricians
American surgeons
University of Texas alumni